T.R.A.S.H. (Tubes Rarities and Smash Hits) is a compilation album by the rock band The Tubes, released in November 1981.

Background
After four studio albums and a live album for A&M Records, the band were working on the Suffer for Sound album when they were dropped by the label. They subsequently signed a deal with Capitol Records in 1981, but to fulfil their contract, A&M released this collection of recordings in November that year, including tracks from their early singles and unreleased material. One track from the shelved Suffer for Sound album, "Drivin' All Night", was included as the album's opener.

T.R.A.S.H. has been described as the band's best album. A review from Billboard picked out the live version of Captain & Tennille's "Love Will Keep Us Together" as a highlight.

Track listing

Side one
1. "Drivin' All Night" (Bill Spooner, Steen, Prairie Prince, Vince Welnick, Cotten, Anderson, Fee Waybill, Styles, Kesse)
from the unreleased album Suffer for Sound, referred to as the "Black" album in the sleeve notes
2. "What Do You Want from Life?" (Spooner, Evans)
from The Tubes
3. "Turn Me On" (Spooner, Steen, Prince, Welnick, Cotten, Anderson, Waybill)
from Remote Control
4. "Slipped My Disco" (Spooner, Steen)
from Young and Rich
5. "Don't Touch Me There" (Ron Nagle, Jane Dornacker) (sic)
from Young and Rich
6. "Mondo Bondage" (Spooner, Steen, Prince, Welnick, Cotten, Anderson, Waybill)
live version from What Do You Want from Live

Side two
1. "Love Will Keep Us Together" (Neil Sedaka, Howard Greenfield)
unreleased live recording from 1976
2. "White Punks on Dope (W.P.O.D.)" Parts A&B (Evans, Spooner, Steen)
Part A is an unreleased live "country rock" version from 1979
Part B is a promo single edit of the track from The Tubes 
3. "Prime Time" (Spooner, Steen, Prince, Welnick, Cotten, Anderson, Waybill)
alternate version of the Remote Control track featuring Re Styles on solo vocals
4. "I'm Just a Mess" (Steen, Spooner)
from Now 
5. "Only the Strong Survive" (Spooner, Steen, Prince, Welnick, Cotten, Anderson, Waybill)
from Remote Control

References

The Tubes albums
1981 compilation albums
A&M Records albums